Red Star (Leonid Konstantinovitch Kovar), formerly named Starfire (Звездный Огонь, Zvezdnyy Ogon'), is a superhero in the DC Universe.

Publication history
A former member of the Teen Titans, Red Star first appeared under the name Starfire in Teen Titans #18 (Dec. 1968) and was created by Len Wein, Marv Wolfman and Bill Draut.

Fictional character biography
While still a young teenager, Leonid Kovar and his father Konstantin (an archaeologist) investigate a spaceship that has crashed into the Yenisei River; during their investigation the ship explodes. It imbues Leonid with energy and gives him super-strength, speed, and pyrokinesis. Being a Russian patriot who believes in communism, he offers his services to his country and becomes the first official Russian superhero in the DC Universe, taking the name Starfire. He does not reappear until The New Teen Titans #18 in 1982. A new character named Starfire is on the team at this point, and Leonid subsequently changes his codename to "Red Star". He is one of the heroes that assemble to fight the Villain War in Crisis on Infinite Earths, although his politics cause friction with both Hawk and Negative Woman, a Soviet defector.

In The New Titans (vol. 2) #76 (1991), Red Star joins the Teen Titans. After two years, Red Star leaves the Titans with Pantha and Baby Wildebeest to form a family. They eventually move to the Soviet locale called 'Science City'.

He is not seen again until the JLA/Titans miniseries in 1999. He makes a few minor appearances over the next few years and is featured in Infinite Crisis #4, in which he is frozen solid by Superboy-Prime after witnessing the brutal murder of Pantha and Baby Wildebeest. In the Infinite Crisis hardback collection, he is seen several hours later at a mass for fallen heroes.

He joins the Titans during the one year jump, but leaves the team for unknown reasons. He helps them in their search for Raven. Since his last appearance he has stopped an invasion of Russia by the aliens from his origin, and been appointed State Protector. He is now based in a ship similar to the one that exploded, hovering over Moscow.

Red Star later greets Tim Drake, a former teammate of his during the one year jump, when he comes to Russia for a meeting with Viktor Mikalek, a powerful business tycoon with suspected ties to the criminal organization known as the Society. When the meeting is interrupted by a vengeful female vigilante named Promise, Red Star intervenes and rescues Mikalek. After finding Tim in the midst of a discussion with Promise, Red Star mistakenly believes that they are working together, only for Tim to reveal Mikalek's dealings with the Society. Red Star claims that he is well aware of Mikalek's criminal activities, and states that they are a necessary evil needed to rescue Russia's failing economy from total collapse. He attacks Tim, who breaks into Red Star's alien ship and discovers a stockpile of nuclear warheads. Following an adventure in the Undernet, Red Robin is allowed to leave.

During the final battle between the Teen Titans and Superboy-Prime's Legion of Doom, Red Star and a group of other former Titans arrive to help turn the tide. He attacks Prime himself, angrily blaming him for the death of his family. Although he does manage to hurt Prime, Red Star is quickly overpowered by the villain, but is rescued by the other Titans.

In the Watchmen sequel Doomsday Clock, Red Star is seen on TV coming out of retirement to serve the people of Russia as a member of the "People's Heroes" alongside other Soviet themed metahumans like Lady Flash of Blue Trinity, and leader Mikhail Arkadin/Pozhar.

Powers and abilities
Red Star is empowered by unknown alien energies that have caused chain reactions within his molecular structure, altering his physical abilities and reflexes. Over time, these abilities have changed and he has developed from merely having augmented strength and speed to being equipped with an array of different powers.

Red Star's abilities include superhuman strength, speed, invulnerability, and endurance. Red Star can also morph into a form that is composed of fire-like energy that allows him to form and redirect energies as well. It seems his powers have the same effect on Kryptonians as his namesake, as he uses them against Superboy-Prime during the Sinestro Corps War.

Other versions

Flashpoint
In the alternate timeline of the Flashpoint event, Red Star is a member of the H.I.V.E. council. He voted for innocent civilians to live in Western Europe between Aquaman and Wonder Woman before using nuclear weapons to end the war.

In other media

Teen Titans

Red Star features prominently in the Teen Titans episode "Snowblind", voiced by Jason Marsden. This version was given powers by a secret government project, but cannot control them and thus lives in voluntary exile in an abandoned Siberian nuclear power plant, which he uses to funnel excess radiation into liquid capsules. A leakage in the containment unit made the radiation seep into a pond, creating a plasma monster which wreaks havoc on surrounding settlements. Encouraged by Starfire to embrace his powers instead of fighting them, Red Star fights the creature and destroys it by pumping it full of energy. However, this causes his own energy to rise to uncontrollable levels, so Starfire takes him into space, where he releases it in a gigantic explosion, seemingly dying in the process. Before his departure, the Titans make Red Star an honorary member, and his people (who previously shunned and feared him) now see him as a hero. Red Star reappears alive in "Titans Together" to help the Titans fight the Brotherhood of Evil.

Arrow
 
Red Star's father, Konstantin Kovar, is mentioned in the Arrow episode "Lost in the Flood" as a Russian criminal and dictator by Taiana Venediktov who rules her village Krasnoyarsk. After Oliver mortally wounds her due to Khushu idol corruption, she requests him to take him down before dying, which Oliver promises as depicted in "Schism". He appears in the season 5 flashbacks as the main antagonist, portrayed by Dolph Lundgren. Oliver goes to Russia to join the ranks of the Bratva to infiltrate his criminal organization, with help from his friend and ally Anatoly Knyazev. He meets him when Oliver was sent to destroy his casino before the capture. He has a connection with corrupt Bratva captain Ishmael Gregor who takes Oliver back to Bratva. Konstantin plans to overthrow the Russian government and return Russia to its former glory and destroy the Bratva in the process. To do this, he meets with businessman and Oliver's future nemesis Malcolm Merlyn to buy sarin gas and kill all members of the Russian government and military in his casino. He also kills Taiana's mother and servant Galina for betrayal. He unleashes the gas, but is prevented by Oliver, Anatoly and his Bratva men. Oliver gives him a deadly blow, but he survives aided by his men and Malcolm in recovering from injury. Kovar later finds out that Oliver goes to Lian Yu for an arranged fake rescue made by Anatoly and captures him. He injects the interrogation drug chemical "Red Star" in him to make him relieve his worst moments in his life and leaves him in his Lian Yu prison cell with a gun. In season five finale, "Lian Yu", Oliver escapes the prison, kills Kovar and his men before setting his own rescue as depicted in "Pilot".

Titans
Mark Antony Krupa played Leonid's father Konstantin Kovar in the pilot episode of Titans. He is killed by Starfire after trying to shoot her during an argument. Afterwards, she takes a picture of Rachel Roth (Raven) from his desk and sets out to find her.

See also
 List of Russian superheroes

References

External links
 List of all of Red Star's appearances

DC Comics characters who are shapeshifters
DC Comics characters with superhuman strength
DC Comics superheroes
DC Comics metahumans
DC Comics characters who can move at superhuman speeds
Fictional military captains
Fictional characters with fire or heat abilities
Fictional characters with nuclear or radiation abilities
Comics characters introduced in 1968
Characters created by Len Wein
Russian superheroes
Soviet Union-themed superheroes
Characters created by Marv Wolfman